Charlott Daudert (27 December 1913 – 19 January 1961) was a German film actress.

Filmography

 The Csardas Princess (1934)
 Frasquita (1934)
 Da stimmt was nicht (1934)
 Old Comrades (1934)
 April, April! (1935)
 Die klugen Frauen (1936)
 The Bashful Casanova (1936)
 Angels with Minor Faults (1936)
 Crooks in Tails(1937)
 Der Etappenhase (1937)
 Don't Promise Me Anything (1937)
 Diamonds (1937)
 The Man Who Couldn't Say No (1938)
 Heimat (1938)
 Das Ehesanatorium (1938)
 Love Letters from the Engadine (1938)
 Shoulder Arms (1939)
 Her First Experience (1939)
 Der vierte kommt nicht (1939)
 Die kluge Schwiegermutter (1939)
 Kitty and the World Conference (1939)
 Men Are That Way (1939)
 We Danced Around the World (1939)
 Midsummer Night's Fire (1939)
 Seitensprünge (1940)
 Liebesschule (1940)
 Die letzte Runde (1940)
 My Daughter Lives in Vienna (1940)
 Venus on Trial (1941)
 Charivan (1941)
 Wenn du noch eine Heimat hast (1942)
  (1942)
 The Big Number (1943)
 The Crew of the Dora (1943)
 Love Premiere (1943)
 A Salzburg Comedy (1943)
 Two Happy People (1943)
 Ich habe von dir geträumt (1944)
 Come Back to Me (1944)
 The Man in the Saddle (1945)
 Insolent and in Love (1948)
 Beloved Liar (1950)
 Theodore the Goalkeeper (1950)
 Wedding with Erika (1950)
 Nacht ohne Sünde  (1950)
 Land der Sehnsucht  (1950)
 Drei Kavaliere (1951)
 The Blue Star of the South (1951)
 Oh, You Dear Fridolin (1952)
 Klettermaxe (1952)
 Knall and Fall as Detectives (1952)
 Father Needs a Wife (1952)
 Heute nacht passiert's (1953)
 Don't Forget Love (1953)
  (1953) 
 Conchita and the Engineer (1954)
 The Hunter's Cross (1954)
 The Crazy Clinic (1954)
 Dein Mund verspricht mir Liebe (1954)
 The Happy Village (1955)
 Melody of the Heath (1956)
 Uns gefällt die Welt  (1956)
 Die Schönste  (1957)
 For Love and Others (1959)

References

Bibliography
 Wolfgang Jacobsen & Hans Helmut Prinzler. Käutner. Spiess, 1992.

External links

1913 births
1961 deaths
German film actresses